Michael David d'Abo (born 1 March 1944) is an English singer and songwriter, best known as the lead vocalist of Manfred Mann from 1966 to their dissolution in 1969, and as the composer of the songs "Handbags and Gladrags" and "Build Me Up Buttercup", the latter of which was a hit for The Foundations. With Manfred Mann, d'Abo achieved six top twenty hits on the UK Singles Chart including "Semi-Detached, Suburban Mr. James", "Ha! Ha! Said The Clown" and the chart topper "Mighty Quinn".

Early years
D'Abo was born in Betchworth, Surrey, the son of Dorothy Primrose (née Harbord) and Edward Nassau Nicolai d'Abo, a London stockbroker. His d'Abo heritage is via the Netherlands and the Dutch East Indies; his maternal line includes Edward Harbord, 3rd Baron Suffield (1781-1835).. He was educated at Wellesley House Prep School in Kent, then at Harrow School and Selwyn College, Cambridge. D'Abo's original intention at Cambridge was to read theology and become a priest but, faced with "everything to learn" (not least Classical Greek and Hebrew), and a disconnect between the "strange, impractical philosophy" he was being taught and his idealism about "bringing comfort to people" and spreading "understanding in the world," he "became wholly disillusioned" (Rave, November 1966). He switched to economics, also unsuccessfully, and left Cambridge with "a first class jazz collection" but without completing his studies.

Band of Angels
His musical career began while he was still at Harrow School. He had minor success with a group of Old Harrovians, A Band of Angels, that had their own comic strip in a UK pop music weekly, Fab 208. A Band of Angels did not make the big time and d'Abo later reflected on what had gone wrong for them: "We weren't right for each other. We weren't a group. They didn't want me to be too outstanding, a thing that happens naturally in most groups.... Also we looked old-fashioned when we started. I knew I looked wrong but I didn't want to change, I looked like me and what I am. It is just lucky that fashion now agrees with me" (Rave, November 1966).

Manfred Mann
In July 1966, after leaving A Band of Angels, D’Abo joined Manfred Mann, an established chart-topping group, as a replacement for lead singer Paul Jones, who was leaving to start a solo career. Comparisons between d'Abo and Jones (whom d'Abo physically resembled) became a media preoccupation at the time of the switch, but d'Abo wasted little time dwelling upon it. "I enjoy being with the group," he told Pete Goodman. "We really do have an enormously wide range of musical tastes among us."

D'Abo's first big hit with Manfred Mann was "Semi-Detached Suburban Mr James". It was nearly recorded with "Mr Jones" in the title before it occurred to the group that it might be interpreted as being an implied reference to Paul Jones. D'Abo first recorded the As Is album (with the attaching single Dylan's "Just Like a Woman").  All of the UK Fontana and US Mercury releases featured d'Abo. 

He composed and produced Chris Farlowe's "Handbags and Gladrags", a hit single (which was also notably recorded by Rod Stewart and Stereophonics and subsequently became the theme music to the BBC television show The Office) and "The Last Goodbye".  He also wrote two songs recorded by Rod Stewart on Immediate Records: "Little Miss Understood" and "So Much to Say (So Little Time)".  With d'Abo fronting, Manfred Mann enjoyed numerous hits, including "Ragamuffin Man", "Ha Ha Said the Clown", "My Name is Jack" and the Dylan-penned number one hit, "Quinn the Eskimo (The Mighty Quinn)", which they retitled as simply "Mighty Quinn".  Manfred Mann subsequently disbanded in 1969.

After Manfred Mann
In 1968, he and Tony Macaulay co-wrote "Build Me Up Buttercup", which was recorded by The Foundations and sold over four million copies by April 1969, including one million discs in the United States.

In December 1968, d'Abo played the lead in Gulliver Travels (subtly, not Gulliver's Travels) at the Mermaid Theatre, Blackfriars, London and he also portrayed Herod on the original recording of Jesus Christ Superstar. He had a short role on the original recording of Evita. He also wrote "Loving Cup" for The Fortunes and "Mary, Won't You Warm My Bed" for Colin Blunstone. In 1970, he composed and performed the music for the Peter Sellers film, There's a Girl in My Soup, and played John Lennon in No One was Saved at the Royal Court Theatre Schools scheme. D'Abo also worked with Mike Smith, the former keyboard player of the Dave Clark Five. In 1976, they released an album on the CBS (UK) label, Smith & d'Abo.

Radio
In 1997, d'Abo presented a programme on BBC Radio Bristol, "The Golden Years", playing music from the 1950s onwards; it broadcast on Saturdays on BBC Radio Gloucestershire. BBC Wiltshire Sound subsequently added the programme to their schedules.

During the 1990s, he also presented "Late Night West", a popular weeknightly programme on west-of-England local radio for five nights a week, that included music, competitions, and a listener phone-in. In the late 1990s he contributed to The Mike d'Abo Story, a documentary written by Geoff Leonard, narrated and produced by Phil Vowels, and broadcast on BBC Radio Bristol and BBC Radio Gloucestershire.

He also presented a number of programmes on BBC Radio 2 in 1986 and 1987.

Family
D'abo has been married three times. His first marriage was to model Maggie London in 1967. They had two children: Ben d'Abo (born 1967) and Olivia d'Abo (born 1969). His second wife was Karen and they had one son, Bruno d'Abo. His third marriage was to Lisa Weaver in 1996, which produced twins Ella and Louis in July 2007. He is a first cousin of actress Maryam d'Abo. His sister Carol is widow of the late Conservative MP and minister Sir Nicholas Baker.

Discography

References

External links

The Manfreds biography
Radio London Fab Forty 28 November 1965 featuring A Band of Angels at #36
New Amen Corner featuring Mike D'Abo Live 2008
Mike D'Abo Interview

1944 births
Living people
English male singers
English songwriters
English people of Dutch descent
Mark
People from Betchworth
People educated at Harrow School
Alumni of Selwyn College, Cambridge
British rhythm and blues boom musicians
Beat musicians
Uni Records artists
BBC Radio 2 presenters
Manfred Mann members
The Manfreds members